Badger is a Message Authentication Code (MAC) based on the idea of universal hashing and was developed by Boesgaard, Scavenius,  Pedersen, Christensen, and Zenner. Since Badger is a MAC function based on the universal hash function approach, the conditions needed for the security of Badger are the same as those for other universal hash functions such as UMAC.

Introduction

The Badger MAC processes a message of length up to  bits and returns an authentication tag of length   bits, where . One can choose larger values of u, but those values do not influence further the security of MAC.

The key setup has to be run only once per key in order to run the Badger algorithm under a given key, since the resulting internal state of the MAC can be saved to be used with any other message that will be processed later.

ENH

Hash families can be combined in order to obtain new hash families. For the ϵ-AU, ϵ-A∆U, and ϵ-ASU families, the latter are contained in the former. For instance, an A∆U family is also an AU family, an ASU is also an A∆U family, and so forth. On the other hand, a stronger family can be reduced to a weaker one, as long as a performance gain can be reached. A method to reduce ∆-universal hash function to universal hash functions will be described in the following.

Theorem 2

Let  be an ϵ-AΔU hash family from a set A to a set B. Consider a message . Then the family H consisting of the functions  is ϵ-AU.

If , then the probability that
 is at most ϵ,
since  is an ϵ-A∆U family. If  but , then the probability is trivially 0.
The proof for Theorem 2 was described in 

The ENH-family is constructed based on the universal hash family NH (which is also used in UMAC):

 

It is a -A∆U hash family.

Lemma 1

The following version of NH is -A∆U:

 

Choosing w=32 and applying Theorem 1, one can obtain the -AU function family ENH, which will be the basic building block of the badger MAC:

 

where all arguments are 32-bits long and the output has 64-bits.

Construction

Badger is constructed using the strongly universality hash family and can be described as

 

where an -AU universal function family H* is used to hash messages of any size onto a fixed size and an -ASU function family F is used to guarantee the strong universality of the overall construction. NH and ENH are used to construct H*. To construct the strongly universal function family F, the ∆-universal hash family MMH* is transformed into a strongly universal hash family by adding another key.

Two steps on Badger

There are two steps that have to be executed for every message: processing phase and finalize phase.

Processing phase
In this phase, the data is hashed to a 64-bit string. A core function  :  is used in this processing phase, that hashes a 128-bit string  to a 64-bit string  as follows:
	
 

for any n,  means addition modulo . Given a 2n-bit string x, L(x) means least significant n bits, and U(x) means most significant n bits.

A message can be processed by using this function.

Pseudo-code of the processing phase is as follow.

 L = |M|
 if L = 0
 M^1 = ⋯ = M^u = 0
 Go to finalization
 r = L mod 64
 if r≠0:
 M = 0^(64-r)∥M
 for i = 1 to u:
 M^i = M
 v^' = max{1, ⌈log_2 L⌉-6}
 for j = 1 to v^':
 divide M^i into 64-bit blocks, M^i = m_t^i∥⋯∥m_1^i
 if t is even:
 M^i = h(k_j^i, m_t^i, m_(t-1)^i) ∥⋯∥ h(k_j^i, m_2^i, m_1^i)
 else
 M^i = m_t^i∥h(k_j^i, m_(t-1)^i, m_(t-2)^i) ∥⋯∥ h(k_j^i, m_2^i, m_1^i)

Finalize phase
In this phase, the 64-string resulting from the processing phase is transformed into the desired MAC tag.

Pseudo-code of the finalization phase

 RabbitKeySetup(K)
 RabbitIVSetup(N)
 for i = 1 to u:
 Q^i =0^7∥L∥M^i
 divide Q^i into 27-bit blocks, Q^i=q_5^i∥⋯∥q_1^i
 S^i =(Σ_(j=1)^5 (q_j^i K_j^i))+K_6^i mod p
 S = S^u∥⋯∥S^1
 S = S ⨁ RabbitNextbit(u∙32)
 return S

Notation:

From the pseudocode above, k denotes the key in the Rabbit Key Setup(K) which initializes Rabbit with the 128-bit key k. M denotes the  message to be hashed and  |M| denotes the length of the message in bits. q_i denotes a message M that is divided into i blocks. For the given 2n-bit string x then L(x) and U(x) respectively denoted its least significant n bits and most significant n bits.

Performance

Boesgard, Christensen and Zenner report the performance of  Badger measured on a 1.0 GHz Pentium III and on a 1.7 GHz Pentium 4 processor. The speed-optimized versions were programmed in assembly language inlined in C and compiled using the Intel C++ 7.1 compiler.

The following table presents Badger's properties for various restricted message lengths. "Memory req." denotes the amount of memory required to store the internal state including key material and the inner state of the Rabbit stream cipher . "Setup" denotes the key setup, and "Fin." denotes finalization with IV-setup.

MMH (Multilinear Modular Hashing)
The name MMH stands for Multilinear-Modular-Hashing. Applications in Multimedia are for example to verify the integrity of an on-line multimedia title. The performance of MMH is based on the improved support of integer scalar products in modern microprocessors.

MMH uses single precision scalar products as its most basic operation. It consists of a (modified) inner product between the message and a key modulo a prime . The construction of MMH works in the finite field  for some prime integer .

MMH*

 

where x, m are vectors, and the functions  are defined as follows.
 =  = 

MMH* should satisfy the security requirements of a MAC, enabling say Ana and Bob to communicate in an authenticated way. They have a secret key . Say Charles listens to the conversation between Ana and Bob and wants to change the message into his own message to Bob which should pass as a message from Ana. So, his message  and Ana's message  will differ in at least one bit (e.g. ).

Assume that Charles knows that the function is of the form  and he knows Ana's message  but he does not know the key x then the probability that Charles can change the message or send his own message can be explained by the following theorem.

Theorem 1:The family MMH* is ∆-universal.

Proof:

Take , and let  be two different messages. Assume without loss of generality that .
 

So, what one actually needs to compute is

But,

From the proof above,  is the collision probability of the attacker in 1 round, so on average  verification queries will suffice to get one message accepted. To reduce the collision probability, it is necessary to choose large p or to concatenate  such MACs using  independent keys so that the collision probability] becomes .

MMH*32
Halevi and Krawczyk construct a variant called . The construction works with 32-bit integers and with the prime integer . Actually the prime p can be chosen to be any prime which satisfies .

  is defined as follows:

 

where   means  (i.e., binary representation)

The functions  are defined as follows.

 

where

 , 

By theorem 1, the collision probability is about ϵ = , and the family of  can be defined as ϵ-almost ∆ Universal with ϵ = .

The value of k
The value of k that describes the length of the message and key vectors has several effects:
 Since the costly modular reduction over k is multiply and add operations increasing k should decrease the speed.
 Since the key x consist of k 32-bit integers increasing k will results in a longer key.

Performance
Below are the timing results for various implementations of MMH in 1997, designed by Halevi and Krawczyk.
 A 150 MHz PowerPC 604 RISC machine running AIX

 A 150 MHz Pentium-Pro machine running Windows NT

 A 200 MHz Pentium-Pro machine running Linux

See also
 UMAC
 VMAC
 Poly1305-AES

References

Articles with example pseudocode
Message authentication codes